Harish Mahapatra was an Indian politician belonging to Indian National Congress. He was elected twice as a legislator of the West Bengal Legislative Assembly.

Biography
Mahapatra was elected as a legislator of the West Bengal Legislative Assembly from Gopiballavpur in 1971. He was elected again in 1972.

Mahapatra died on 3 November 2019.

References

2019 deaths
Members of the West Bengal Legislative Assembly
Year of birth missing
Indian National Congress politicians from West Bengal
Place of death missing
Place of birth missing